The obturator externus groove is the groove on the posterior neck of the femur for the insertion of the obturator externus muscle, a muscle that is important during bipedal locomotion.

This landmark is used as evidence of bipedal locomotion in the hominins.  The fossil Orrorin tugenensis (6-7 mya) possesses the obturator externus groove, which suggests that it moved bipedally and could represent one of the earliest fossils with evidence of bipedal locomotion.

Bones of the lower limb